Representative Council elections were held for the first time in Ubangi-Shari on 15 December 1946. The result was a victory for the Ubangian Economic and Social Action list led by Barthélemy Boganda, which won all 15 seats in the second college (for Africans), whilst the Chamber of Commerce List won all 10 seats in the first college.

Results

References

Ubangi
Elections in the Central African Republic
1946 in Ubangi-Shari
Election and referendum articles with incomplete results